Evergreen School may refer to:
 Evergreen School (Evergreen, Alabama), American school building
 Evergreen School (Jaipur), Indian school in Rajasthan
 Evergreen School (Shoreline), American private school in Washington state

See also 
 Evergreen High School (disambiguation)
 Evergreen School District (disambiguation)